The desert monitor (Varanus griseus) is a species of monitor lizard of the order Squamata found living throughout North Africa and Central and South Asia. The desert monitor is carnivorous, feeding on a wide range of vertebrates and invertebrates.

Description

Body features
Varanus griseus monitor lizards normally display a variety of body coloration from light brown and yellow to grey.  They average about one meter in length, but can reach total body lengths of almost two meters.  These lizards can also have horizontal bands on either their backs or tails, along with yellow spots across their backs.  Their young are normally a brightly colored orange and have distinctive bands across their backs which may be lost as they mature.  Their nostrils are slits located farther back on their snouts (closer to the eyes than the nose), and their overall body size is dependent on the available food supply, the time of year, environmental climate, and reproductive state.  Males are generally larger and more robust than females, but females have a more gentle look about them.  Those differences allow males to be distinguished from females from a distance without careful inspection.  Adult monitor lizards also go through periods of molting in which they shed their outer layer of skin to expand their overall body size.  This process can take several months and happens around three times per year.  Their skin is adapted to the desert environment where they live, and they are excellent swimmers and divers and have been known to enter the water occasionally to hunt for food.

Subspecies
Three subspecies have been described:

 V. g. griseus (grey monitor)
 V. g. caspius (Caspian monitor)
 V. g. koniecznyi (Indian desert monitor)

Varanus griseus griseus
The V. g. griseus subspecies (grey monitor) has five to eight narrow grey bands on its back, as well as 19-28 bands on its tail.  Its tail is more rounded that those of the other subspecies, and the final size of the adult depends on which habitat they are living.  Their coloration can be from simple grey (in desert-like ecosystems) to brilliantly colored (in areas with large amounts of plant growth).  Their most common prey is lizards and snakes, but can also include ground-nesting birds and other small mammals.

Varanus griseus caspius
The V. g. caspius subspecies (Caspian monitor) has five to eight bands on its back, 13-19 bands on its tail, a plain tail tip, and about 143 rows of scales in the middle section of its body.  It has the largest body of the three subspecies, and is considered to be in danger of becoming extinct.

They are found in mainly sandy or clay environments, although sporadically in sparsely woodland areas.  Their diets include tortoises and their eggs, small mammals, and adult cobras and vipers.  They are strong diggers and can easily build burrows that are several feet long.

Varanus griseus koniecznyi
The V. g. koniecznyi subspecies (Indian desert monitor) has three to five bands on its back, 13-19 bands on its tail, a plain tail tip, 108-139 rows of scales on its midsection, and a broader and flatter head when compared to the other subspecies.  It is mainly found in Pakistan and India, and has the smallest body of the three subspecies.

They have been reported to possibly not go through the normal hibernation period over the winter, but are still inactive and do not feed between December and March.  Their normal diets consist mainly of invertebrates, but can also branch out to other lizards and small mammals.

Lifestyle
V. griseus goes into hibernation from about September to April.  In April is a mass exodus from their hibernation, and they become most active between May and July.  During the middle of the day, the lizards mainly stay in their burrows and only come to the desert surface to search for food.  The monitor lizards require approximately 3 to 4 full hibernation periods (years) to reach their full size (about 55–65 cm excluding their tails) and at least 3 hibernation periods before they become sexually mature.  The overall lifespan of V. griseus in the wild does not normally exceed around 8 years in both males and females.

Importance of body temperature
V. griseus is a cold-blooded ectotherm whose behaviors therefore depend on the outside temperatures. Many lizards become sluggish in cold weather and even may become inactive if the temperature decreases substantially.  Their olfactory and nerve signals significantly slow down, which severely limit the lizard from either catching potential prey or escaping from predators. The body temperature of V. griseus is directly proportional to its running speed between the temperatures of 21 and 37 °C. Between those temperatures, the running speed of the monitor lizard increases from a little over 1 m/s at 21 °C to around 3 m/s at 37 °C. Over 37 °C, its running speed does not increase, and below 21 °C, the lizards are extremely sluggish. If they are being pursued by a predator while their body temperature is less than 21 °C, they will not flee, but will instead hold their ground and become extremely aggressive.

The body temperature of V. griseus depends mainly on the outside environment (time of day, season, etc.).  Their internal temperatures begin warming up before they even leave their burrows through conductive heat gain, and their temperatures rapidly rise once they begin basking in the morning sun and reach their highest point in the noonday heat.  The specific body temperature of V. griseus can vary depending on the average temperatures of the country they live in, but their maximum body temperature does not usually exceed 38.5 °C even when basking in the sunlight.  Male monitor lizards are generally more active and have a higher average body temperature than the females.  The body temperature of the lizard during hibernation is 15.0 to 30.5 °C, but in many areas, the average body temperature during hibernation is around 16-18 °C.

The species is one of the few monitor lizards that tolerate relatively cold temperatures, being present as far north as south-west Kazakhstan.

Reproduction
Desert monitor reproduction normally takes place between May and July. Copulation occurs in May and June, and the lizards normally lay their eggs from the latter part of June through the beginning of July. The eggs are incubated at temperatures from 29 to 31 °C, and hatch after an average of 120 days.  At birth, the baby lizards have a total length of around 25 cm.<ref name="Monitor">[http://www.monitor-lizards.net/species/psammosaurus/griseus.html Varanus griseus (Daudin 1803) Desert Monitor"] </ref>

Feeding, hunting, and diet
Like most members of the genus Varanus, V. griseus is a carnivore.  The preferred prey of the species is mice, eggs, or fish, but it will also prey on smaller mammals, reptiles, birds, amphibians, insects, or other invertebrates, if the opportunity presents itself.

Venom
The possibility of venom in the genus Varanus is widely debated.  Previously, venom was thought to be unique to Serpentes (snakes) and Heloderma (venomous lizards).  The aftereffects of a Varanus bite were thought to be due to oral bacteria alone, but recent studies have shown  venom glands are more likely in the mouths of several, if not all of the species.  V. griseus has not yet been specifically tested, but its bites have shown aftereffects consistent with the venomous bites from other varanid lizards.  The venom can be used as a defensive mechanism to fend off predators, to help digest food, to sustain oral hygiene, and possibly to help in capturing and killing prey.

ConservationVaranus griseus is not threatened in much of its habitat, although a great deal of the land previously inhabited by the subspecies V. g. caspius'' has been turned into farmland, which puts pressure on the species. Around 17,000 skins of this lizard are involved in commercial trade every year. The species is listed under Appendix I of the Convention on International Trade in Endangered Species of Wild Fauna and Flora (CITES) meaning commercial international trade is prohibited. In northern Africa, central Asia, and parts of India, the species is unprotected from hunting laws and is still hunted commercially.

Captivity
These lizards rarely do well and, at most, live only a few years in captivity. On occasion, when their living requirements can be specifically met, they have been documented to live for more than 17 years, although they never become docile, and never become accustomed to being handled.  In captivity, their environments should mirror those of many ground-dwelling animals, as well as their natural desert habitat. They require lower temperatures to hibernate during the winter, along with warmer temperatures during the summer months, and their diets in captivity should be similar to their diets in the wild.

Distribution
The desert monitor has a wide distribution across many countries and regions. It can be found in Jordan, Turkey, Morocco, Algeria, Tunisia, Libya, Egypt, Israel, Syria, Lebanon, Iraq, Oman, Turkmenistan, Kazakhstan, Uzbekistan, Tajikistan, Kyrgyzstan, Western Sahara, Mauritania, Mali, Niger, Chad, Sudan, Afghanistan, Iran (including the Kavir desert), Pakistan, and northwest India. Its type locality is Dardsha, located on the coast of the Caspian Sea.

References

External links
 Photos of Desert Monitor at Arkive.org
 Desert Monitor account at moroccoherps.com 
 Photos of Desert Monitor 
 
 Tsellarius, A. Y.;Cherlin, V. A.;Menshikov, Y. A. 1991 Preliminary report on the study of biology of Varanus griseus (Reptilia, Varanidae) in Middle Asia Herpetological Researches  (1): 61-103

Varanus
Lizards of Africa
Reptiles of Central Asia
Fauna of the Sahara
Reptiles of India
Reptiles of Iran
Reptiles of the Middle East
Reptiles of Pakistan
Reptiles of the Arabian Peninsula
Fauna of Turkey
Reptiles described in 1803
Taxa named by François Marie Daudin